CFNI may stand for:

 Christ for the Nations Institute, a Christian educational institute in Dallas, Texas
 CFNI (AM), a radio station in Port Hardy, British Columbia, Canada.